Dragoljub Blažić (5 October 1938 – 1991) was a Yugoslav footballer.

Career
Born in Skopje, he started playing in 1953 in the youth levels of FK Vojvodina where, after two years, aged only 16, he debuted for the senior team. In 1957 he made news with his transfer to FK Partizan where he played until summer 1959. Then, he joins Dinamo Zagreb where he played until the end of the 1960–61 season. Playing mostly as left-wing, he won with Dinamo Zagreb the 1960 Yugoslav Cup. He was known for great technic skills and was an excellent dribbler.

References

1938 births
1991 deaths
Footballers from Skopje
Association football midfielders
Yugoslav footballers
Macedonian footballers
FK Vojvodina players
FK Partizan players
GNK Dinamo Zagreb players
Yugoslav First League players